Rear Admiral Mohammad Nazmul Hassan, NPP, ndc, ncc, psc is a two star Admiral of Bangladesh and currently serving as Assistant Chief of Naval Staff (Personnel). Prior to join here, he served as Commander, Chattogram Naval Area. Before that, he was High Commissioner of Bangladesh to the Republic of Maldives. He also served as the commander of Bangladesh Navy Fleet. Before that, he was Director of Naval Operations and Director of Naval Intelligence at Naval Headquarters.

Early life and education 
He completed his Bachelor of Science degree from Chittagong University and Masters in Defence Studies from National University, Bangladesh.

Military career 
Nazmul Hassan was commissioned in the Bangladesh Navy on 01 July 1986. He Commanded four warships of Bangladesh Navy. He also commanded the Bangladesh Naval Academy, Naval Aviation and the Navy’s Special Force, SWADS. During his tenure as an Ambassador of Maldives, Bangladesh has received 201,600 vaccine doses as a gesture of goodwill. He signed a bilateral agreement with Maldives' Health Minister Ahmed Naseem for the AstraZeneca Vaccines.  In response, medical team of the Bangladesh Armed Forces sent to Maldives to assist in the Maldive Government’s vaccination programme. Admiral Hassan assumed the duties of High Commissioner of Bangladesh in the Republic of Maldives on 17 March 2020 and discharge until January 2022. He appointed as Assistant Chief of Naval Staff (Personnel) on January, 2023.

Personal life 
Rear Admiral Nazmul is happily married to Begum Nadia Sultana Hasan and the couple is blessed with a son and a daughter.

References 

Bangladesh Navy personnel
Bangladeshi Navy admirals
High Commissioners of Bangladesh to the Maldives
Year of birth missing (living people)
Living people